Ross N. Sterling (January 18, 1931 – January 14, 1988) was a United States district judge of the United States District Court for the Southern District of Texas.

Education and career

Sterling was born in Houston, Texas in the same year that his grand-uncle Ross S. Sterling became governor of the state. Sterling was in the United States Army from 1951 to 1954, and then received a Bachelor of Arts degree from the University of Texas at Austin in 1956 followed by a Bachelor of Laws from the University of Texas School of Law in 1957. He was a law clerk to John Robert Brown of the United States Court of Appeals for the Fifth Circuit from 1957 to 1958, and was thereafter in private practice with the Houston firm of Vinson and Elkins until 1976. Sterling was made a partner of that firm in 1969. Sterling was also active in Republican Party politics chairing a precinct in Houston and participating in state Republican conventions.

Federal judicial service

On April 13, 1976, President Gerald Ford nominated Sterling to a seat on the United States District Court for the Southern District of Texas vacated by Judge Allen Burroughs Hannay. Sterling was confirmed by the United States Senate on May 6, 1976, and received his commission the following day. He served until his death on January 14, 1988, in Houston.

References

Sources
 

1931 births
1988 deaths
People from Houston
Judges of the United States District Court for the Southern District of Texas
United States district court judges appointed by Gerald Ford
20th-century American judges
United States Army soldiers
University of Texas at Austin alumni
University of Texas School of Law alumni